John Sullivan (born 11 March 1948) is a former English cricketer. He played for Gloucestershire between 1968 and 1977.

References

External links

1948 births
Living people
English cricketers
Gloucestershire cricketers
Cricketers from Bristol
Wicket-keepers